Pennington County is a county in the northwestern part of the U.S. state of Minnesota. As of the 2020 census, the population was 13,992. Its county seat is Thief River Falls.

History
The Wisconsin Territory was established by the federal government effective July 3, 1836, and existed until its eastern portion was granted statehood (as Wisconsin) in 1848. The federal government set up the Minnesota Territory in the remaining territory, effective March 3, 1849. The newly organized territorial legislature created nine counties across the territory in October of that year. One of those original counties, Pembina, had its lower portion partitioned in 1858 by the newly organized Minnesota State legislature to create Polk County. On December 24, 1896, the legislature partitioned the northern portion of Polk to create Red Lake County. Then on November 23, 1910, the northern part of Red Lake was sectioned off to create Pennington County, the penultimate Minnesota county to be created (followed by Lake of the Woods in 1922). The county was named for Edmund Pennington (1848-1926), a longtime Minnesota railroad executive, who was serving as president of the Minneapolis, St. Paul, and Sault Ste. Marie Railway when the county was formed. Thief River Falls, the area's major settlement (platted in 1887), was specified as the county seat.

Geography
 
The Red Lake River flows westward into the county from Beltrami County through Pennington's central portion. Near Thief River Falls it is joined by the Thief River, flowing southward into the county from Marshall County. The combined flow exits Pennington County toward the south, then swings west- and northwestward as it moves to its confluence with the Red River near Grand Forks, North Dakota. The county terrain consists of low rolling hills, lightly wooded, with all available areas devoted to agriculture. The terrain slopes to the west and south, with its highest point near the lower east border, at 1,186' (361m) ASL. Pennington is one of 17 Minnesota savanna region counties with more savanna soils than either prairie or forest soils.

Major highways

  U.S. Highway 59
  Minnesota State Highway 1
  Minnesota State Highway 32
  Minnesota State Highway 219
  Pennington County State-Aid Highway 3: Major connector between Pennington County and Grand Forks. Connects with Polk County State-Aid Highway 21.
  Pennington County State-Aid Highway 17:  Connects Thief River Falls to the Airport
  Pennington County State-Aid Highway 10:  Major route, also known as Pembina Trail
  Pennington County State-Aid Highway 16:  US 59 Truck Bypass of Thief River Falls, connects US 59 / MN 1 on the west side of town to MN 32 on the south side of town
   Pennington County State-Aid Highways 27 & 28:  Designated and designed for heavy truck traffic connecting US 2 to Roseau County and Marshall County

Airports
 Thief River Falls Regional Airport

Adjacent counties

 Marshall County - north
 Beltrami County - east
 Clearwater County - southeast
 Red Lake County - south
 Polk County - west

Protected areas
 Higinbotham State Wildlife Management Area
 Pembina State Wildlife Management Area

Demographics

2000 census
As of the 2000 census, there were 13,584 people, 5,525 households, and 3,552 families in the county. The population density was 22.0/sqmi (8.50/km2). There were 6,033 housing units at an average density of 9.78.sqmi (3.78/km2). The racial makeup of the county was 97.02% White, 0.21% Black or African American, 0.82% Native American, 0.59% Asian, 0.04% Pacific Islander, 0.51% from other races, and 0.81% from two or more races.  1.24% of the population were Hispanic or Latino of any race. 49.0% were of Norwegian, 15.4% German and 7.2% Swedish ancestry.

There were 5,525 households, out of which 30.60% had children under the age of 18 living with them, 51.70% were married couples living together, 9.10% had a female householder with no husband present, and 35.70% were non-families. 29.50% of all households were made up of individuals, and 12.60% had someone living alone who was 65 years of age or older.  The average household size was 2.38 and the average family size was 2.95.

The county population contained 24.50% under the age of 18, 10.30% from 18 to 24, 26.50% from 25 to 44, 22.90% from 45 to 64, and 15.80% who were 65 years of age or older. The median age was 38 years. For every 100 females there were 97.50 males. For every 100 females age 18 and over, there were 94.60 males.

The median income for a household in the county was $34,216, and the median income for a family was $43,936. Males had a median income of $30,771 versus $21,078 for females. The per capita income for the county was $17,346.  About 7.70% of families and 11.10% of the population were below the poverty line, including 10.70% of those under age 18 and 14.80% of those age 65 or over.

2020 Census

Communities

Cities
 Goodridge
 St. Hilaire
 Thief River Falls (county seat)

Unincorporated communities

 Dakota Junction
 Erie
 Hazel
 Highlanding
 Kratka
 Mavie
 River Valley

Townships

 Black River Township
 Bray Township
 Clover Leaf Township
 Deer Park Township
 Goodridge Township
 Hickory Township
 Highlanding Township
 Kratka Township
 Mayfield Township
 Norden Township
 North Township
 Numedal Township
 Polk Centre Township
 Reiner Township
 River Falls Township
 Rocksbury Township
 Sanders Township
 Silverton Township
 Smiley Township
 Star Township
 Wyandotte Township

Politics
Pennington County has a fairly balanced voting record but has tended to vote Republican in recent decades. In 60% of national elections since 1980 the county selected the Republican Party candidate (as of 2020).

See also
 National Register of Historic Places listings in Pennington County, Minnesota

References

 
Minnesota counties
1910 establishments in Minnesota
Populated places established in 1910